The Pinch Singer is a 1936 Our Gang short comedy film directed by Fred C. Newmeyer. It was the 142nd Our Gang short released.

Plot
The gang's Eagles Club holds auditions for a performer to send to a local amateur radio talent contest, with $50 going to the winner. Despite Alfalfa's repeated attempts to upstage his competition, Darla is chosen to represent the club at the talent contest after her performance of "I'm in the Mood for Love." However, when Darla fails to show up at the radio station, Spanky runs frantically to look for her, while Alfalfa decides to take it upon himself and take Darla's place on the radio program.

Alfalfa begins crooning "I'm in the Mood for Love." When the gang hears Alfalfa on the radio, they race to the pay phones at the nearest drugstore and rig the contest, calling in vote after vote for Alfalfa. Spanky returns to the station with Darla just as Alfalfa finishes the performance. As Spanky begins to berate Alfalfa for acting on his own, the emcee informs them that Alfalfa won the $50 prize. Suddenly, Spanky has nothing but confidence in Alfalfa's future singing efforts at which Alfalfa abruptly silences with a gong.

Cast

The Gang
 Darla Hood as Darla
 Eugene Lee as Porky
 George McFarland as Spanky
 Carl Switzer as Alfalfa
 Billie Thomas as Buckwheat
 Billy Minderhout as Boy who recites
 Harold Switzer as Harold
 Jerry Tucker as Jerry
 Marianne Edwards as Marianne
 Sidney Kibrick as Eagles Club member
 Leonard Kibrick as Eagles Club member (scenes deleted)
 Donald Proffitt as Eagles Club member (scenes deleted)
 Pete The Pup as himself

Additional Eagles Club members
Daniel Boone, John Collum, Rex Downing, Kay Frye, Barbara Goodrich, Paul Hilton, Peggy Lynch, Dickie De Nuet

Additional cast
 Bud Murray Dancers as Famous Broadway Artists
 Gloria Brown as Famous Broadway Artists dancer
 Betsy Gay as Famous Broadway Artists dancer
 Dickie Jones as Famous Broadway Artists dancer
 Jackie Morrow as Plantation Trio member
 Warner, Walt, and George Weidler as Saxophone players
 Chet Brandenburg as Audience extra
 Eddie Craven as Elevator boy
 Blair Davies as Radio announcer
 Gail Goodson as Information girl
 Charlie Hall as Druggist and audience extra
 Marvin Hatley as Marvin, music conductor
 Bill Madsen as Page
 Chet Brandenberg as Audience member
 Lester Dorr as Audience member
 Junior Cavanaugh as Undetermined role
 Betty Cox as Undetermined role
 Dorian Johnson as Undetermined role
 Harry McCabe as Undetermined role
 Delmar Watson as Undetermined role

See also
 Our Gang filmography

References

External links

1936 films
1936 comedy films
1936 short films
American black-and-white films
Films directed by Fred C. Newmeyer
Metro-Goldwyn-Mayer short films
Our Gang films
1930s American films
1930s English-language films